State Route 128 (SR 128) is a primary state highway in the U.S. state of Virginia.  Known for most of its length as Mayflower Drive, the state highway runs  from SR 163 north to U.S. Route 460 Business (US 460 Business) and US 501 Business within the independent city of Lynchburg.

Route description

SR 128 begins at an intersection with SR 163 (Wards Road).  The state highway heads east as Candlers Mountain Road, a five-lane road with a center left-turn lane.  The highway becomes a divided highway at its partial cloverleaf interchange with the Lynchburg Expressway, which carries US 29 Business north and south and US 501 to the south.  There is no access from eastbound SR 128 to the southbound expressway; that movement is provided via SR 163.  SR 128 and US 501 head east past the River Ridge Mall and across Norfolk Southern Railway's Danville District.  Just east of the railroad, Candlers Mountain Road turns south toward Liberty University and US 501 continues east to join US 29 and US 460 on their freeway bypass of Lynchburg.  SR 128 turns north onto two-lane undivided Mayflower Drive, which heads east through several industrial parks.  North of Odd Fellows Road, the state highway veers east and then north again.  For its at-grade intersection with Norfolk Southern Railway's Durham District rail line, SR 128 makes a sharp curve east, passes through a hairpin turn back west, in the middle of which the highway intersects the railroad, and curves north again.  North of that railroad crossing, the state highway passes through a residential area and reaches its northern terminus at Campbell Avenue, which features US 460 Business and US 501 Business.

Major intersections

References

External links

Virginia Highways Project: VA 128

128
State Route 128